Syed Suleman (29 December 1938  14 April 2021), also known as S. Suleman or Sullu Bhai, was a Pakistani film director. He also appeared in Bollywood films with minor roles before migrating to Pakistan and after migration, he directed around forty-eight films in Pakistan film industry, including two Punjabi films between 1961 and 1998.

He made his acting debut with an Indian film Mela playing the younger role of Dilip Kumar. He made his directorial debut with Gulfam (1961) while his last film as a director is Very Good Dunya Very Bad Log (1998). Zeenat (1975) is the first film of Suleman which helped him to earn his first Nigar Awards — Best Director. He also directed Urdu TV serials after leaving Pakistan film industry.

Early life 
He was born as Syed Suleman in Hyderabad State, British India (in modern-day Hyderabad, India). Following the partition, he migrated to Pakistan along with his two brothers. He married actor, dancer Zareen Panna in the mid-60s with whom he had five children, including three sons and two daughters. S. Suleman first worked as an assistant to the veteran film director Anwar Kamal Pasha. He is the recipient of ten Nigar Awards, he was the younger brother of Santosh Kumar and Darpan.

Career 
He first appeared in films in 1947, when he played Dilip Kumar's younger role in film Mela (1948). After moving to Pakistan following the partition of India, he ventured in Pakistan films in the mid-50s. He initially worked at the editing department, and later a Pakistani film director and producer Anwar Kamal Pasha made him assistant director for film Sarfarosh (1956) starring Suleman's elder brother Santosh Kumar and sister-in-law Sabiha Khanum. He later worked as an assistant director of Saat Lakh (1957) and Saathi (1959). Following the promotion of Saathi, he made his directorial debut with Gulfam. In 1963, he collaborated with Darpan for Baaji (1963) and Taangewala (1963). In 1966, he directed Tamasha that flopped at the box office. A year later, the film flopped he collaborated with a writer Agha Hasan Imtisal and a music director Nisar Bazmi for the production of Jaise Jante Nahin (1969), Bewafaa (1970), Sabaq (1972), and Shararat (1976). Bewafaa was the only film of Suleman starring Waheed Murad. Noted Pakistani film director Syed Noor first had assisted him in film direction before launching his own career independently. 

After creating ten films in collaboration with Muhammad Ali and Zeba, he worked with new actors such as Nadeem Baig and Shabnam. He also introduced Ghulam Mohiuddin to films with Anarri, Babra Sharif with Intezar (1974), Waseem Abbas with Manzil (1981). Some singers also made their debut with Suleman's films such as Mujeeb Aalam with "Main Khushsi Se Kyun Na Gaaon" from Lori, Tahira Syed with "Yeh Mehfil Jo Aaj Saji Hai" from Muhabbat, and Zil-e-Huma with "Sulagh Raha Hai Tann Mera" from Very Good Dunya Very Bad Log'

Following the introduction of Videocassette recorder (VCR) in Pakistan, he directed action-thriller films Manzil (1981) and Tere Bina Kya Jeena (1982) starring Muhammad Ali. After making 48 films, he left film industry and joined television where he directed serials such as Colony 52, Kiya Yehi Pyar Hai and Ana.

 Filmography 

 Television Colony 52 (2004)Kiya Yehi Pyar Hai Ana (2004)Abdullah Karwani
Taal Wala
Kuch Dil Ne Kaha (2006)

Death 
He was suffering from diabetes and kidney disease for some time before his death. He was admitted to a private hospital in Lahore where he died on 14 April 2021.

Awards 
He was the recipient of twelve awards, including ten Nigar Awards by Nigar magazine, one Sitara-i-Imtiaz (Star of Excellence) award and the Pride of Performance award by the government of Pakistan.

References

External links 
 

1938 births
2021 deaths
Pakistani male film actors
Film directors from Lahore
Pakistani people of Hyderabadi descent
Nigar Award winners
Recipients of Sitara-i-Imtiaz
Recipients of the Pride of Performance